My House may refer to:

Film and TV
 My House (film), a 2003 Japanese drama film
 "My House", episode 121 of Scrubs
 My House (2015 TV series), a 2015 South Korean TV series
 My House (2018 TV Series), a 2018 American TV series

Music
 My House (album), a 2012 album by Oceana
 My House (EP), a 2015 EP by Flo Rida, or its title track
 "My House" (Flo Rida song)
 "My House" (Elderbrook song), 2020
 "My House" (Kids of 88 song), 2009
 "My House" (Warren G song), 2015
 "My House", a song by Terrorvision from the album Formaldehyde, 1993
 "My House", a song by PVRIS from the album White Noise, 2014

See also
 It's My House (disambiguation)
 My Home (disambiguation)
 My Place (disambiguation)
 Our House (disambiguation)